The Open Araba en Femenino is a tournament for professional female tennis players. The event on outdoor hardcourts is classified as a $60,000 ITF Women's World Tennis Tour tournament and has been held in Vitoria-Gasteiz, Spain, since 2019.

Past finals

Singles

Doubles

External links
 ITF search
 Official website

ITF Women's World Tennis Tour
Hard court tennis tournaments
Tennis tournaments in Spain
2019 establishments in Spain